Boy Eats Girl is a 2005 horror-comedy film directed by Stephen Bradley and starring Samantha Mumba, produced and shot in Ireland. The plot tells of a teenage boy who comes back to life as a zombie, similar to the plot of the American film My Boyfriend's Back.

Plot
While working in the church, a woman named Grace finds a hidden crypt. While exploring she discovers a voodoo book, however she is soon sent away by Father Cornelius. Grace's son, Nathan, attends the local high school with his friends Henry and Diggs. Nathan likes his long-time friend Jessica, however he is too scared to ask her out, for fear of rejection. Also in the school are popular girls Charlotte, Glenda and Cheryl. Cheryl pursues Nathan, despite already having a boyfriend, Samson, who confronts Nathan along with his womanising friend Kenneth after seeing Cheryl talking to Nathan. Meanwhile, Henry and Diggs, fed up with Nathan not asking out Jessica, force the pair to meet after school.

While Nathan waits for Jessica, he writes a note about what he will say to her to ask her out. Meanwhile, Jessica's over-protective father forbids her to leave, but she sneaks out. Nathan becomes impatient due to Jessica's lateness and leaves before Jessica arrives; she reads the note, however, through a misunderstanding, Nathan believes Jessica is with Kenneth. Nathan goes home and contemplates hanging himself in his room. Just as he dismisses the idea, Grace enters and knocks over the chair Nathan is standing on, causing him to be hanged. Grace returns to the church and performs a ritual from the book, which brings Nathan back to life. The ritual seems to have gone well, despite Nathan not remembering what happened, however Father Cornelius soon warns Grace that the book was damaged and those who are resurrected by it have the urge to eat human flesh.

At school, Nathan hears Kenneth lying about what happened with Jessica the previous night to Samson and another friend, Shane. As Jessica attempts to ask Nathan out, he turns her down, thinking what Kenneth said was true. As the day progresses, Nathan slowly succumbs to the symptoms of the book. At night, everyone heads to a school disco, where Nathan soon becomes more zombie-like and bites Samson before returning home. As Samson becomes a zombie, he attacks Shane and infects him. Jessica goes to Nathan's house to sort things out, but Nathan warns Jessica away from him, realising something is wrong with him.

The next morning, Grace tells Nathan what happened. Nathan realises that Samson is infected and tries to get the police to help capture him, but he is ignored. Returning home, Grace locks Nathan in the garage and starts to search for something to help him recover. Meanwhile, Charlotte has also become a zombie and infects Kenneth. Cheryl and Glenda go to a local bar, where they witness a zombie attack. Henry and Diggs also witness a zombie attack in the video shop. Henry and Diggs hide, and see that most of the town have been infected. They phone Jessica and tell her to lock herself inside her house. Henry and Diggs travel to Nathan's house and free him, before setting off to Jessica's. However, on their way they crash their car and have to continue on foot. Jessica is attacked by zombies in her house, including Samson, but she overpowers them and manages to escape.

Grace goes to the church, but is attacked by an infected Father Cornelius. He is soon bitten by a snake in the crypt, revealing the snake's venom is the cure to the infection. She takes the snake and leaves. Outside, Cheryl and Glenda are hiding in the graveyard. They encounter the infected Charlotte, who bites Glenda, allowing Cheryl to get away. Nathan finds Jessica in a barn beside her house, where Jessica tells Nathan that she never did anything with Kenneth. Meanwhile, Henry and Diggs arrive at Jessica's house, followed by Cheryl, who is being chased by a group of zombies. They hide in a cupboard in the house until night time, when they try to escape. As they go outside they are saved by Nathan, however a group of zombies close in on them. Jessica manages to kill them with the aid of a tractor.

The survivors hide in the barn, but Samson and Shane get in and infect Cheryl. The others manage to escape to a platform, but are now trapped. They pour gasoline onto the barn floor, before Grace arrives with the snake. However, the snake escapes and the zombies begin to attack Grace. Nathan saves Grace, allowing her to escape, and also kills Samson. Nathan soon completely succumbs to the ritual, and becomes a zombie. As he is about to attack his friends, the snake bites him. The zombies quickly attack Nathan and he is caught in the fire that Jessica has ignited. Jessica, Diggs and Henry leave, and soon discover Nathan survived the fire. He finally asks Jessica to go out with him, to which she answers yes.

Cast
 Samantha Mumba as Jessica
 David Leon as Nathan
 Tadhg Murphy as Diggs
 Laurence Kinlan as Henry
 Sara James as Cheryl
 Mark Huberman as Samson
 Sarah Burke as Charlotte
 Paul Reid as Shane
 Jane Valentine as Glenda
 Conor Ryan as Kenneth
 Deirdre O'Kane as Grace
 Lalor Roddy as Father Cornelius
 Domhnall Gleeson as Bernard

Production
The film was shot in six weeks.  Director Stephen Bradley cast Deirdre O'Kane, his wife, over her objections that she was too young to convincingly play the mother of a teenager. The film was shot in Dublin and the Isle of Man.  The special effects were done by Bob Keen.

Release
The film was the first non-pornographic film for some years to be banned by the Irish Film Classification Office (IFCO), due to a depiction of suicide. While the scene was not cut from the film, the IFCO appeals board overturned the ban, issuing a 15A rating.  Boy Eats Girl premiered at the London UK Film Focus. It was picked up for theatrical release by Optimum Releasing, and it received its Irish theatrical premiere on 23 September 2005.

Home media

The film was released on DVD on 18 December 2007.

Reception
Rotten Tomatoes, a review aggregator, reports that Boy Eats Girl received positive reviews from 80% of five surveyed critics; the average rating was 5.7/10. Joshua Siebalt of Dread Central rated the film 3/5 stars and called it "fun, plain and simple." Felix Vasquez, Jr. of Film Threat rated the film 3/5 stars and called it "a pretty kick ass rom-zom-com that deserves at least a viewing." Bill Gibron of DVD Talk rated the film 2/5; Gibron stated that the film "looks really good" and has moody, atmospheric shots, but the film itself is too derivative of Shaun of the Dead. David Johnson of DVD Verdict called it "Funny, gory and just flat-out entertaining". Mike Bruno of Entertainment Weekly called it "kinda stupid and riddled with plot holes" but "a pretty good time." Bloody Disgusting rated the film 3/5 stars and described it as "an OK zombie film that plays on teen love antics".

References

External links
 
 
 

2005 films
2005 comedy horror films
2005 independent films
2000s English-language films
2000s teen comedy films
2000s teen horror films
British independent films
British teen comedy films
British teen horror films
British zombie comedy films
English-language Irish films
Films set in Ireland
Irish comedy horror films
Irish independent films
Irish teen comedy films
Irish teen horror films
Film controversies in Ireland
Rating controversies in film
Obscenity controversies in film
2000s British films